On 25 August 2021, a gunman opened fire at two locations in Dar es Salaam, Tanzania. He initially killed two police officers at an intersection and stole the officers' rifles. He walked several hundred metres to the French embassy, where he killed another officer and a security guard. The gunman also injured six other people, before being shot dead by police. The attack occurred during the day on Ali Hassan Mwinyi Road, one of Dar es Salaam's main avenues in the diplomatic quarter.

Background to the massacre 
On 2 September 2021, authorities confirmed that the attacker, identified as Hamza Mohamed, was motivated by Islamic extremism. Prior to the shooting, he visited social media pages related to the Islamic State of Iraq and the Levant. Simon Sirro, the chief police inspector in charge of the investigation, said the attack was probably motivated by the Tanzanian government's fight against Islamic terrorists in Mozambique. Such attacks were relatively rare in Tanzania, although there have been Islamist attacks in the past, including the killing of police officers and civil servants in the eastern district of Kibiti in 2016 and 2017.

Commemoration 
In Dar es Salaam, on the eve of the attack, dozens of Tanzanian police officers, politicians and citizens gathered to pay tribute to the victims.

References

2021 murders in Africa
2020s crimes in Tanzania
21st-century mass murder in Africa 
Attacks on diplomatic missions in Tanzania
Attacks on diplomatic missions of France
August 2021 crimes in Africa
Shooting
Islamic terrorist incidents in 2021
Islamic terrorism in Kenya
Mass murder in 2021
Murder in Tanzania
Spree shootings in Africa
Terrorist incidents in Africa in 2021